Frenchman Butte is a butte located 45 km northeast of Lloydminster, is named after a Frenchman who was killed there by Indians in the 19th century. It is not known how or why this man was murdered. This was also the site of the Battle of Frenchman's Butte between Major-General Thomas Bland Strange and Cree Chief Big Bear.

The site of the battle was designated a National Historic Site of Canada in 1929.

See also 
 Battle of Frenchman's Butte
 Frenchman Butte No. 501, Saskatchewan

References 

Frenchman Butte No. 501, Saskatchewan
National Historic Sites in Saskatchewan
Buttes